Chycina  is a village in the administrative district of Gmina Bledzew, within Międzyrzecz County, Lubusz Voivodeship, in western Poland.

The village is known for the Summer Sports Center of the Poznan University School of Physical Education.

References

Chycina